Alloy is the fourth studio album by the Finnish funeral doom band Skepticism.

History
The album was released in both Finland and the USA by Red Stream Inc. on October 20, 2008, five years after the band's previous album, Farmakon. Following the album's release, Skepticism went on an "Exorcising the Funeral" tour alongside the bands Pantheist and Ophis. Skepticism also performed at the Dutch Doom Days and have plans for "The Maniacal Alloy Tour" with Esoteric.

Track listing
 "The Arrival" – 6:38
 "March October" – 10:30
 "Antimony" – 8:46
 "The Curtain" – 5:48
 "Pendulum" – 9:13
 "Oars in the Dusk" – 6:22

Personnel
Matti - vocals
Jani Kekarainen - guitars
Eero Pöyry - keyboards
Lasse Pelkonen - drums

References

2008 albums
Skepticism (band) albums